Shameless is a British comedy series set in Manchester on the fictional Chatsworth council estate, created and partially written by Paul Abbott, who is also the programme's executive producer. Produced by Company Pictures for Channel 4, the series aired from 13 January 2004 to 28 May 2013. The comedy drama, centred on British working class culture, was accorded critical acclaim by various sections of the British media, including the newspaper The Sun and Newsnight Review on BBC Two. In 2005, the show won "Best Drama Series" at the BAFTA TV Awards and "Best TV Comedy Drama" at the British Comedy Awards. The network Showtime adapted the series into its own American version, which debuted in 2011.

Series overview

Episodes

Series 1 (2004)

Series 2 (2005)

Series 3 (2006)

Series 4 (2007)

Series 5 (2008)

Series 6 (2009)

Series 7 (2010)

Series 8 (2011)

Series 9 (2012)

Series 10 (2012)

Series 11 (2013)

References

External links
Summary of episodes from Channel 4
Detailed episode guides from British Comedy Guide

Lists of British comedy-drama television series episodes